Cappuccino is a 1989 Australian comedy film about out of work actors.

References

External links
 Cappuccino at IMDb
 Cappuccino at Oz Movies

Australian comedy films
1980s English-language films
1989 films
1989 comedy films
1980s Australian films
English-language comedy films